Hollis S. Summers Jr. (June 21, 1916 – November 14, 1987) was an American poet, novelist, short story writer and editor.

Background and education
Born on June 21, 1916, in Eminence, Kentucky, Summers earned an A.B in English from Georgetown College in 1937, an M.A. from Middlebury College in 1943 and a Ph.D. from the University of Iowa in 1949.

Academic career

Summers worked in a variety of educational settings. From 1937 to 1944, he taught as an English teacher at Holmes High School in Covington, Kentucky. From 1944 to 1949, Summers worked at Georgetown College.  And from 1949 to 1959, he served as Professor of English at the University of Kentucky. Summers spent the majority of his academic career at Ohio University where he worked from 1959 until his retirement.

Bibliography

Books
 
 

Coauthored with James F. Rourke, published under the pseudonym Jim Hollis
 
 
 

Edited by Summers
 
 
 
 

Summers served as editor
 

Edited by Summers and Edgar Whan
 
 
 
 
 
 
 
 
 

Coauthored with James F. Rourke, published under the pseudonym Jim Hollis

Periodical publication
Poetry
 "The Flicker." Beloit Poetry Journal, 5 (Spring 1955): 117.
 "Committee Meeting," Sewanee Review, 64 (Autumn 1956): 606.
 "Mexico Picnic, October 31," Saturday Review, 40 (12 January 1957): 54.
 "Lexington, Kentucky," American Weave, 100 (Spring 1961): 4–6.
 "Seven Occasions for Song," Hudson Review, 15 (Spring 1962): 86–87.
 "Title: To Be Supplied," Western Humanities Review, 17 (Winter 1963): 64.
 "Waiting Bench with Figure," Midwest Quarterly, 7 (Autumn 1964): 96.
 "The Gift," New Mexico Quarterly, 25 (Summer 1965): 137.
 "Snapshots of the Four Grandchildren," Atlantic, 217 (May 1966): 113.
 "Mercy," English Record, 19 (February 1969): 28.
 "Grace Before Calling the Nursing Home and the Jail," Southern Poetry Review, 16 (1977): 83.

Fiction
 "Mister Joseph Potts," Paris Review, 8 (Spring 1955): 107–121.
 "The Prayer Meeting," Sewanee Review, 64 (Winter 1956): 110–122.
 "Cafe Nore," Epoch, 8 (Fall 1957): 153–166.
 "If You Don't Go Out the Way You Came In," Colorado Quarterly, 9 (Summer 1960): 69–83.
 "The Third Ocean," Hudson Review, 22 (Summer 1969): 232–252.

Nonfiction

References

Sources

External links
 https://web.archive.org/web/20110514110140/http://www.english.eku.edu/SERVICES/KYLIT/summers.htm

1916 births
1987 deaths
Georgetown College (Kentucky) alumni
Middlebury College alumni
Ohio University faculty
People from Henry County, Kentucky
University of Iowa alumni
University of Kentucky faculty
Writers from Kentucky